= Sara Dircxdochter =

Sara Dircxdochter (died after 1550) was a Dutch transvestite.

Dircxdochter was sentenced, on 4 March 1550, to the pillory and to four years banishment, for posing as a man under the name Salomon Dircxzoon. She was exposed when spending the night in a hostel for men, dressed as a man. Her case is notable as one of the first confirmed cases of a woman being sentenced and tried for posing as a man in Europe.

There was a previous case in France in 1535, but most of the other cases of cross-dressing women in the Middle Ages are unconfirmed.
